Gannutz Glacier is a smooth glacier which flows north from the Bowers Mountains of Victoria Land, Antarctica and enters the eastern part of Rennick Bay between Weeder Rock and Stuhlinger Ice Piedmont. It was first mapped by the United States Geological Survey from surveys and U.S. Navy air photos, 1960–65, and was named by the Advisory Committee on Antarctic Names for Theodore P. Gannutz, a biologist at Hallett Station in the 1966–67 season, and station scientific leader at Palmer Station in 1968. The glacier lies on the Pennell Coast, a portion of Antarctica lying between Cape Williams and Cape Adare.

References

Glaciers of Pennell Coast